Theerthayaathra is a 1972 Indian Malayalam film,  directed by A. Vincent and produced by R. S. Prabhu. The film stars Madhu, Sharada, Sukumari and Kaviyoor Ponnamma in the lead roles. The film had musical score by A. T. Ummer. The movie was also the debut film for Telugu actress Supriya (Jayalakshmi Reddy) as Parvathikkutty.

Cast

Madhu as Rajagopalan
Sharada as Savithri/Thaathrikkutty
Kaviyoor Ponnamma as Kochikkaavu
Supriya (Fatafat Jayalaxmi) as Parvathikkutty
Adoor Bhasi as Pavithran Namboothiri
Philomina as Ammukuttyamma
Sukumari as Sreekumarikkutty
Master Sathyajith as Vasu
Prema as Kunjaathol
Sankaradi as Krishnan Ashan
Sudheer as Thankappan, Tile Company Owner
Abbas as Abdulla
Metilda
P. O. Thomas as Bus Driver Kuttappan
Pala Thankam as Pathumma
Premji as Thirumeni
R. K. Nair
Shantha
Sreeni
Sumithra as Nangyarukutty
Thodupuzha Radhakrishnan as Rajagopalan's friend
Vijayakala
Subhadra

Soundtrack
The music was composed by A. T. Ummer and the lyrics were written by P. Bhaskaran.

References

External links
 

1972 films
1970s Malayalam-language films
Films directed by A. Vincent